Saint-Martin-de-Varengeville is a commune in the Seine-Maritime department in the Normandy region in northern France.

Geography

Population

Places of interest

The church of St. Martin, dating from the nineteenth century. 

 The chapel of St. Gilles, dating from the seventeenth century.
 The nineteenth-century chateau Le Breton.
 The seventeenth-century stone cross.
 The chapel of St. Anne.
 Traces of an ancient castle.

See also
Communes of the Seine-Maritime department

References

External links

Official website 

Communes of Seine-Maritime